Mahenge is a town in the Mahenge Mountains of Tanzania. It is the headquarters of Ulanga District in Morogoro Region.

There is a hospital, a market, and primary schools. A Catholic Capuchin mission was established around 1897, and there is now a St. Francis Kasita Seminary at Mahenge. The Diocese of Mahenge was established in 1964. The German East African  officer, Theodor von Hassel died here in 1935. His son, Kai-Uwe von Hassel later became the  Minister President of Schleswig-Holstein.

NGOs in Mahenge 
 SolidarMed Solidar Suisse 
 Eye Care Foundation

External links 
 

Populated places in Morogoro Region